The 2015 Four Nations Tournament (Torneio Quatro Nações) in Portuguese, was the second edition of the Four Nations Tournament held in João Pessoa, Brazil between 10–13 June as a Men's friendly handball tournament organised by the Brazilian Handball Confederation.

Results

Round robin

Final standing

References

External links
Brazilian Handball Confederation Official Website

Four Nations Tournament (handball)
2015 in handball
2015 in Brazilian sport
Four